The Tomb of Haydar Amuli or Mir Heydar Amoli Tomb Tower and Monument Seyyed Se Tan is the burial place of Haydar Amuli, the Iranian Mystic and Philosopher. The mausoleum is located in Amol, Iran. Tomb production date, the primary structure was built 6th century AD. The Building brick and octagonal tower and pyramidal dome with height of 12 meters.
Two other erudite has been buried here, Izz al-Din Amuli founder mausoleum, himself was a mathematician.

Gallery

References

External links
 Iran (Bradt Travel Guides) by Patricia L Baker
 History Of Islamic Philosophy - Page 96

Buildings and structures in Mazandaran Province
Tourist attractions in Mazandaran Province
Tourist attractions in Amol
Mausoleums in Iran
Towers in Iran